Castleford is a town in the metropolitan borough of the City of Wakefield, West Yorkshire, England.  The town and the surrounding area contain 13 listed buildings that are recorded in the National Heritage List for England.  All the listed buildings are designated at Grade II, the lowest of the three grades, which is applied to "buildings of national importance and special interest".  The listed buildings include houses and associated structures, farm buildings, a bridge, a church, a public urinal, a public house, a former miners' institute, and a former school.


Buildings

References

Citations

Sources

 

Lists of listed buildings in West Yorkshire